Oscar Cantú (born December 5, 1966) is a Mexican-American prelate of the Roman Catholic Church who has been serving as bishop of the Diocese of San Jose in California since 2018. He served as bishop of the Diocese of Las Cruces in New Mexico from 2013 to 2018, and as an auxiliary bishop of the Archdiocese of San Antonio in Texas from 2008 to 2013. When Cantú became a bishop in 2008, he was the youngest bishop in the United States.

Biography

Early years 
Oscar Cantú was born on December 5, 1966, in Houston, Texas, the son of Ramiro and Maria de Jesus Cantú, natives of small towns near Monterrey, Mexico. He is the fifth of eight children.

Cantú attended Holy Name Catholic School and St. Thomas High School in Houston and graduated from the University of Dallas. He received his Master of Divinity and Master of Theological Studies from the University of St. Thomas in Houston. Cantú attended the Pontifical Gregorian University in Rome from 1998 to 2002, earning a Licentiate in Sacred Theology and a Doctor of Dogmatic Theology. He is fluent in English, Spanish, Italian, and French.

Priesthood 
Cantú was ordained a priest by Archbishop Joseph Fiorenza of the Archdiocese of Galveston-Houston on May 21, 1994. Cantú spent his early career as a priest working in Houston area parishes. His first assignment was as curate at St. Christopher Parish. He taught at the University of St. Thomas and at St. Mary’s Seminary, and served as pastor of Holy Name Parish.

Cantú conducted youth retreats in the Christian Family Movement in the archdiocese, and worked with the Engaged Encounter ministry. He was also involved in The Metropolitan Organization (TMO), which addresses fair housing, immigration, and education.

Auxiliary Bishop of San Antonio 
Pope Benedict XVI appointed Cantú titular bishop of Dardanus and auxiliary bishop of the Archdiocese of San Antonio in 2008. He was consecrated a bishop on June 2, 2008, by Archbishop José Gómez. At the time, Cantú was the youngest bishop in the United States. He chose as his episcopal motto Zelus domus tuae comedit me (Zeal for the Lord's house consumes me).

Bishop of Las Cruces
On January 10, 2013, Cantú was named the second bishop of the Diocese of Las Cruces. He was installed on February 28, 2013. At the time, he was the youngest bishop to head a diocese in the United States.

Cantú visited Japan in 2015 for the ceremonies marking the 70th anniversary of the atomic bombings of Nagasaki and Hiroshima. He was a representative of the United States Conference of Catholic Bishops (USCCB) at the state visit of Pope Francis to Mexico in February 2016.

Bishop of San Jose
Pope Francis appointed Cantú as coadjutor bishop of the Diocese of San Jose on July 11, 2018.  He was installed on September 28, 2018. On May 1, 2019, after the retirement of Bishop Patrick J. McGrath, Cantú automatically became the third bishop of San Jose.

Cantú chaired the USCCB Committee on International Justice and Peace from 2015 to 2017. In that role, he visited churches in the Middle East, Africa, Latin America, and Asia.  These included churches in South Sudan and the Democratic Republic of the Congo that were under great duress. He twice visited Iraq and Cuba. Cantú visited churches in Gaza, Jerusalem, Israel, and the West Bank, advocating the Catholic Church position on a two-state solution to the conflict between Israel and the Palestinians. He spoke at the United Nations against the proliferation of nuclear weapons. He called for religious liberty in the Middle East, Indonesia, Malaysia, and India.

In November 2020, the Congregation for Bishops at the Vatican initiated an investigation into Cantu’s handling of allegations of clerical sexual abuse and misconduct when he was bishop of the Diocese of Las Cruces. The investigation is being carried out under the provisions of Vos estis lux mundi, the 2019 law for holding bishops accountable in the handling of sexual abuse cases.

See also

 Catholic Church hierarchy
 Catholic Church in the United States
 Historical list of the Catholic bishops of the United States
 List of Catholic bishops of the United States
 Lists of patriarchs, archbishops, and bishops

References

External links
Roman Catholic Diocese of San Jose Official Site
Roman Catholic Diocese of Las Cruces Official Site
Catholic-Hierarchy
Archdiocese of San Antonio

Episcopal succession

 

1966 births
Living people
Clergy from Houston
Roman Catholic bishops in New Mexico
St. Thomas High School (Houston, Texas) alumni
University of St. Thomas (Texas) alumni
University of Dallas alumni
Pontifical Gregorian University alumni
Catholics from Texas
American people of Mexican descent
21st-century Roman Catholic bishops in the United States